When Pigs Fly is a 1993 German-American-Dutch comedy film directed by Sara Driver and starring Alfred Molina.

Plot

Cast
Alfred Molina as Marty
Marianne Faithfull as Lilly
Maggie O'Neill as Sheila
Seymour Cassel as Frank
Rachael Bella as Ruthie
Megan Follows as Kathleen

References

External links
 
 

American comedy films
Dutch comedy films
German comedy films
English-language Dutch films
English-language German films
Films directed by Sara Driver
1990s English-language films
1990s American films
1990s German films